Ana Bešlić (16 March 1912, Šarapusta near Bajmok – 27 February 2008, Belgrade) was a Serbian sculptor.

Biography
She was born in a Sárapuszta (modern-day Šarapusta) near the Bačkan town of Bajmok, between Sombor and Subotica, at that time in Bács-Bodrog County, Kingdom of Hungary, Austria-Hungary to a family of Bunjevac origins.

Ana Bešlić was one of the most important representatives of modern sculpture in Yugoslavia and Serbia. By genre, she belonged to the group of artists that, since the 1950s, became recognisable by their artistic curiosity and non-mainstream approach, being the pioneers of changing of sculptor's style in Yugoslavia. Still, her creations were mostly oriented towards the making of monuments.

She attended schools in Zagreb, Graz and Vienna, but she developed her artistic education at the Academy of Fine Arts in Belgrade in 1949.

Part of her works were donated to the city of Subotica, including the monument of Blaško Rajić.

She spent her final years in Belgrade, where she died in 2008.

Works 
Her best known sculptures are Plamen, Majka i dete, Talija, Slomljena krila (being one of the best known sights in Palić), Majka i sin, Podravka's rooster, Tina Turner, and Blaško Rajić.

Legacy 
She won numerous awards for her work. Rajko Ljubič, a film director from Subotica, made a documentary about her in 2005.

External links 
 
 
 
 
 Ana Beslic, Spomenik Database

Croats of Vojvodina
Artists from Subotica
Artists from Belgrade
2008 deaths
1912 births
20th-century Serbian sculptors
Bunjevci
Serbian women sculptors
20th-century women artists